Yuan Hongdao (1568–1610) was a Chinese poet of the Ming Dynasty, and one of the Three Yuan Brothers, along with his brothers Yuan Zongdao and Yuan Zhongdao.  Hongdao's life spanned nearly the whole of the Wanli period (1573-1620) in Chinese history. A native of Gong'an in Hukuang, his family had been military officials for generations. Hongdao showed an interest in literature from youth and formed his own literary club at age fifteen. At the age of twenty-four in 1592 he took the jinshi examination and subsequently received an official position in 1595. However he quit out of boredom after a year. He traveled and consulted with the radical philosopher Li Zhi. On another trip his brothers joined him. Hu's elder brother was a Buddhist-Confucianist synchronist. His travels resulted in his publishing a poetry compilation Jietuo ji [Collection of One Released]. His and his two brothers' poetry, which focused on clarity and sincerity, produced a following eventually known as the Gong'an school, the central belief of which was that good writing was a result of genuine emotions and personal experience. When his elder brother Zongdao died in 1600, Hongdao retired to a small island in a lake to meditate and write poetry. The resulting work is Xiaobi tangji [Jade-Green Bamboo Hall Collection].

Poems 

THE CAPITAL

Bright are the city walls of the capital;

Red-robed officials shout on broad streets.

There is a white-headed destitute scholar;

Hanging from his mule's saddle, sheaves of poems.

Clasping his calling card, he knocks on doors for work;

The gate keepers smirk at one another.

Ten try and ten fail;

Walk the streets, his face is haggard.

Always fear in serving the rich;

Sorry your flattery isn't quick enough.

Over an eye a black eyepatch;

Half blind, the fellow is old!

A STRANGE PRIEST

Bought his mantle to escape draft and taxes;

Now he's the head priest amid his splendor.

Recites incantations, but sounds like a bird;

Writes Sanskrit that looks like twisted weeds.

With his begging bowl he distributes food of the spirit;

On his seat he faces the lamp of Buddha;

If you don't devote you whole body and soul,

How can there be anywhere Buddhism at all?

Prose writings 
He was also a notable author of the xiaopin, a form of short literary essay.

References

Bibliography 
 Chaves, Jonathan trans. Pilgrim of the Clouds, New York-Tokyo, 1978; new edition Buffalo New York:  White Pine Press, 2005.
 Carpenter, Bruce E. "The Gentleman of Stones: Yüan Hung-tao", Tezukayama University Review (Tezukayama Daigaku ronshu), Nara, Japan, no. 24, 1979. 
 Mair, Victor H. (ed.) (2001). The Columbia History of Chinese Literature. New York: Columbia University Press. . (Amazon Kindle edition.)

External links
oberlin.edu/mao_xiang
renditions.org/yuanhd

Ming dynasty poets
1568 births
1610 deaths
Ming dynasty essayists
People from Jingzhou
Poets from Hubei
Chinese tea masters